Xie Xingfang (born January 8, 1981) is a retired Chinese badminton player from Guangzhou, Guangdong. She is a former defending two-time world champion for women's singles, and former women's singles World No. 1.

Her first big title was in girls' doubles, with her provincial team mate Zhang Jiewen, at the World Junior Championships in 1998. She has also won a bronze medal at the World Junior Championships in mixed doubles with Cai Yun. However, once she entered the Chinese national team, she switched to singles. 2004 was her "break-out" year, as she won several top tier titles on the world circuit. Xie and her senior compatriot and rival Zhang Ning were the most dominant international women's singles players of the middle and late parts of the decade, though they were pressed by younger teammates such as Zhu Lin, Lu Lan, Jiang Yanjiao and Wang Yihan. Due to her height and slender figure, she is regarded to have elegant movement. Xie's strengths were her reach, quickness, consistency, and court sense. She was a member of China's world champion Uber Cup teams of 2004, 2006, and 2008.

Her last appearance as a player in a major badminton competition came at the National Games of China in October 2009.

During most of her badminton career Xie was romantically involved with fellow Chinese badminton star Lin Dan. In 2006 Xie and Lin won their respective women's and men's singles titles at the IBF World Championships in Madrid. Xie had also won the world title in 2005 when Lin finished second to Indonesia's Taufik Hidayat. Xie Xingfang and Lin Dan were married in Guangzhou, China, on 13 December 2010, after seven years of dating. She is also a mother of a son, Lin Xiao Yu, who was born on 5 November 2016.

Achievements

Olympic Games 
Women's singles

World Championships 
Women's singles

World Cup 
Women's singles

Asian Games 
Women's singles

Asian Championships 
Women's singles

World Junior Championships 
Girls' doubles

Mixed doubles

Asian Junior Championships 
Girls' doubles

BWF Superseries 
The BWF Superseries, launched on 14 December 2006 and implemented in 2007, is a series of elite badminton tournaments, sanctioned by Badminton World Federation (BWF). BWF Superseries has two levels: Superseries and Superseries Premier. A season of Superseries features twelve tournaments around the world, which introduced since 2011, with successful players invited to the Superseries Finals held at the year end.

Women's singles

  BWF Superseries tournament
  BWF Superseries Premier tournament
  BWF Superseries Finals tournament

BWF Grand Prix 
The BWF Grand Prix has two levels, the BWF Grand Prix and Grand Prix Gold. It is a series of badminton tournaments sanctioned by the Badminton World Federation (BWF) since 2007. The World Badminton Grand Prix has been sanctioned by the International Badminton Federation since 1983.

Women's singles

 BWF Grand Prix Gold tournament
 BWF & IBF Grand Prix tournament

IBF International 
Women's singles

Record against selected opponents 
Record against year-end Finals finalists, World Championships semi-finalists, and Olympic quarter-finalists.

References

External links
  Xie Xingfang's blog
  The official Xie Xingfang website
  The official China Badminton website
 

1981 births
Living people
Badminton players from Guangzhou
World No. 1 badminton players
Medalists at the 2008 Summer Olympics
Olympic badminton players of China
Olympic medalists in badminton
Olympic silver medalists for China
Badminton players at the 2008 Summer Olympics
Asian Games medalists in badminton
Badminton players at the 2006 Asian Games
Chinese female badminton players
Asian Games gold medalists for China
Asian Games bronze medalists for China
Medalists at the 2006 Asian Games
Guangzhou Sport University alumni